LeRoy-Ostrander High School is a high school in southeastern Minnesota located in the town of Le Roy, Minnesota in the United States.  LeRoy-Ostrander serves 305 students K-12.
Aaron Hungerholt is the principal.

References

External links
 http://www.leroy.k12.mn.us/

Public high schools in Minnesota
Schools in Mower County, Minnesota
Public middle schools in Minnesota
Public elementary schools in Minnesota